The 2016–17 Sydney FC season was the club's 12th season since its establishment in 2004. The club participated in the A-League for the 12th time, the FFA Cup for the 3rd time.

Players

Squad information

From youth squad

Transfers in

Transfers out

Contracts Extensions

Technical staff

Statistics

Squad statistics

|-
|colspan="19"|Players no longer at the club:

Preseason and friendlies

Competitions

Overall

A-League

League table

Results summary

Results by round

Matches

Finals series

FFA Cup

End-of-season awards
On May 13, 2017, Sydney FC hosted their annual Sky Blue Ball and presented eight awards on the night.

References

External links
 Official Website

Sydney FC
Sydney FC seasons